The two  were fought during Oda Nobunaga's attempted sieges of the Ishiyama Hongan-ji in Osaka. The Hongan-ji was the primary fortress of the Ikkō-ikki, mobs of warrior monks, priests, and farmers who opposed Oda's rule. He ordered one of his admirals, Kuki Yoshitaka, to organize a blockade against the fleets of the Ikki's allies, who sought to supply the fortress and break the siege. Many of the ruling families of the neighboring provinces opposed Oda, chief among them the Mōri clan.

First battle (1576)

In the first battle, in 1576, the Mōri navy led by Motoyoshi, son of Murakami Takeyoshi, defeated Kuki Yoshitaka's fleet, breaking the blockade and supplying the fortress. Both sides fought with firearms, a rather new development in Japanese warfare; but Mōri's experience and knowledge of naval tactics was ultimately the deciding factor.

Second battle (1578)

Two years later, the Ishiyama Hongan-ji was still under siege, and Oda's fleet, with Takigawa Kazumasu commanded a White Ship to accompany the six black ships commanded by Kuki Yoshitaka against Mori navy, made another attempt to break the Mōri supply lines. Going against convention, Yoshitaka fought with six very large o'atakebune ships, rather than a combination of small (kobaya), medium (sekibune), and large (adakebune) craft. Normally, atakebune were floating wooden fortresses covered in gun and bow emplacements. According to some accounts, it may be believed that these six were Tekkōsen, the first ironclads, and were built such that guns could not penetrate them. However, these crafts probably had limited iron plating in key locations rather than true ironclads, made primarily or entirely of metal.

Several Mōri vessels under Murakami Takeyoshi were burned and sunk, and Oda's fleet ultimately achieved victory. The supply lines were broken, and the Hongan-Ji fell soon afterward. However, the Mori discovered an existing flaw in the Tekkōsen design during this battle. As Mōri samurai rushed to board the large ship, all the defending warriors ran to that side of the deck to defend themselves, and the vessel capsized as its center of gravity shifted.

Yoshitaka went on to defeat the Mōri once more the following year.

References

1576 in Japan
Conflicts in 1576
Kizugawaguchi
Mōri clan
Kizugawaguchi